Illicit is an album by the fusion jazz band Tribal Tech released in 1992. The album was recorded during the L.A. Riots in April 1992 at Cherokee Studios, Hollywood, California.

Track listing

 "The Big Wave"  (Gary Willis)  – 6:31 	
 "Stoopid" (Gary Willis) – 5:47 	
 "Black Cherry" (Scott Henderson) – 6:42 	
 "Torque" (Scott Henderson) – 6:02 	
 "Slidin' Into Charlisa (Scott Henderson) – 7:32 	
 "Root Food" (Scott Henderson) – 8:13 	
 "Riot" (Tribal Tech) – 6:58 	
 "Paha-Sapa" (Gary Willis) – 3:24 	
 "Babylon" (Gary Willis) – 5:26 	
 "Aftermath" (Tribal Tech) – 7:03

Personnel
Scott Henderson - guitar
Gary Willis - bass
Scott Kinsey - keyboards
Kirk Covington - drums

== 'The Big Wave''' ==
(Gubbio, Italy, March 1993) Scott Henderson, during the child-like intro of 'The Big Wave''': "This is a tune that Willis wrote, it's..uhh...kinda about the situation in Los Angeles as far as the music scene, has anybody ever been there? Los Angeles people? You're not missing anything believe me.. All the jazz there sounds exactly like this. It's very happy and pleasant....So we hate it! So we're gonna play a tune dedicated to the situation and the Los Angeles jazz scene."

References

1992 albums
Tribal Tech albums